Pyrrhocoricin is a 20-residue long antimicrobial peptide of the firebug Pyrrhocoris apterus.

Structure and function 

Pyrrhocoricin is primarily active against Gram-negative bacteria. The peptide is proline-rich with proline-arginine repeats, as well a critical threonine residue, which is required for activity through O-glycosylation. Like the antimicrobial peptides drosocin and abaecin, pyrrhocoricin binds to the bacterial protein DnaK, inhibiting cell machinery and replication. Only the L-enantiomer of pyrrhocoricin is active against bacteria. The action of pyrrhocoricin-like peptides is potentiated by the presence of pore-forming peptides, which facilitates the entry of pyrrhocoricin-like peptides into the bacterial cell. Proline-rich peptides like Pyrrhocoricin can also bind to microbe ribosomes, preventing protein translation. In the absence of pore-forming peptides, pyrrhocoricin is taken into the bacteria by the action of bacterial uptake permeases.

References 

Insect immunity
Antimicrobial peptides